Asura erythrias is a moth of the family Erebidae. It is found in western Africa.

References

erythrias
Fauna of Gabon
Moths of Africa
Moths described in 1893